In the field of pharmacokinetics, the area under the curve (AUC) is the definite integral of the concentration of a drug in blood plasma as a function of time (this can be done using liquid chromatography–mass spectrometry). In practice, the drug concentration is measured at certain discrete points in time and the trapezoidal rule is used to estimate AUC.

Interpretation and usefulness of AUC values

The AUC (from zero to infinity) represents the total drug exposure across time. AUC is a useful metric when trying to determine whether two formulations of the same dose (for example a capsule and a tablet) result in equal amounts of tissue or plasma exposure. Another use is in the therapeutic drug monitoring of drugs with a narrow therapeutic index.  For example, gentamicin is an antibiotic that can be nephrotoxic (kidney damaging) and ototoxic (hearing damaging); measurement of gentamicin through concentrations in a patient's plasma and calculation of the AUC is used to guide the dosage of this drug.

AUC becomes useful for knowing the average concentration over a time interval, AUC/t.  Also, AUC is referenced when talking about elimination.  The amount eliminated by the body (mass) = clearance (volume/time) * AUC (mass*time/volume).

AUC and bioavailability

In pharmacokinetics, bioavailability generally refers to the fraction of drug that is absorbed systemically and is thus available to produce a biological effect. This is often measured by quantifying the "AUC". In order to determine the respective AUCs, the serum concentration vs. time plots are typically gathered using C-14 labeled drugs and AMS (accelerated mass spectrometry).

Bioavailability can be measured in terms of "absolute bioavailability" or "relative bioavailability".

Absolute bioavailability

Absolute bioavailability refers to the bioavailability of drug when administered via a non-intravenous (non-IV) dosage form (i.e. oral tablet, suppository, subcutaneous, etc.) compared with the bioavailability of the same drug administered intravenously (IV). This is done by comparing the AUC of the non-intravenous dosage form with the AUC for the drug administered intravenously. This fraction is normalized by multiplying by each dosage form's respective dose.

Relative bioavailability

Relative bioavailability compares the bioavailability between two different dosage forms. Again, the relative AUCs are used to make this comparison and relative doses are used to normalize the calculation.

See also
 Cmax (pharmacology)
 Cmean (pharmacology)
 "Area Under Curve" of the Receiver operating characteristic

References

Pharmacokinetics